The Japan Kennel Club (ジャパンケネルクラブ) is the primary registry body for purebred dog pedigrees in Japan.

It hosts the FCI (Fédération Cynologique Internationale) Japan International Dog Show held annually at the Tokyo Big Sight;  the event also includes two grooming competitions, with the highest award regarded as the "best in Japan" title.

Other than conformation shows, the JKC promotes obedience trials for purebred dogs and confers championship and other titles in obedience and similar competitions; the JKC also certifies and examines groomers, trainers and other dog-related professionals. It also administers tests and certifies rescue dogs, as well as host rescue dog competitions.

History 
The Club became a member of the Fédération Cynologique Internationale (World Canine Federation) in 1979.

See also
Nihon Ken Hozonkai

References

External links

Dog breeds originating in Japan
Fédération Cynologique Internationale
Kennel clubs
1949 establishments in Japan